The 2001 Toronto Argonauts finished in 4th place in the East Division of the 2001 CFL season with a 7–11 record and failed to qualify for the playoffs.

Offseason

CFL draft

Preseason

Regular season

Season standings

Regular season

 † Game rescheduled from September 16 due to the September 11 attacks.

Postseason
After finishing last in the East division, the Argonauts failed to qualify for the playoffs.

Awards and records

2001 CFL All-Stars
RB – Michael Jenkins
DE – Elfrid Payton
CB – Wayne Shaw

Eastern Division All-Star Selections
RB – Michael Jenkins
SB – Derrell Mitchell
WR – Ted Alford
OG – Jude St. John
DE – Elfrid Payton
CB – Wayne Shaw

References

Toronto Argonauts seasons
Toro